Laurie Fellner (born January 15, 1968) is an American former handball player who competed in the 1992 Summer Olympics and in the 1996 Summer Olympics.

References

1968 births
Living people
American female handball players
Olympic handball players of the United States
Handball players at the 1992 Summer Olympics
Handball players at the 1996 Summer Olympics
21st-century American women
Pan American Games gold medalists for the United States
Competitors at the 1995 Pan American Games
Medalists at the 1995 Pan American Games
Pan American Games medalists in handball